Tell me is the title of an advertisement calling for universal suffrage in Hong Kong.  It ran once as a full page ad on the front page of most Hong Kong newspapers on 28 October 2005, and inspired many other people and groups in Hong Kong to run advertisements supporting democracy, in response to the government's reform proposal which ruled out universal suffrage in 2007 and 2008 elections.

It was written in white text on a dark background. It also included a picture of an hourglass. About HK$200,000 ($25,600) was spent in placing the ads. In 2007, two more ads were placed costing about HK$100,000.  The old man quoted in the ad worked in the property industry and is now retired. Legislator James To assisted him in designing and placing the advertisements.

See also
 2005 Hong Kong electoral reform
December 2005 protest for democracy in Hong Kong

References

Politics of Hong Kong
2005 in Hong Kong
Chinese advertising slogans
2005 neologisms
Advertising campaigns